Bruce Henderson is an American journalist and author of more than 20 nonfiction books, including a #1 New York Times bestseller, And the Sea Will Tell. His most recent New York Times bestseller is Sons and Soldiers: The Untold Story of the Jews Who Escaped the Nazis and Returned with the U.S. Army to Fight Hitler. Henderson's books have been translated into French, Spanish, Italian, Portuguese, Danish, Dutch, Chinese, Japanese, Hungarian and Czech. A member of the Authors Guild, Henderson has taught reporting and writing courses at USC School of Journalism and Stanford University.

Born in Oakland, California, he served in the United States Navy during the Vietnam War and attended college on the G.I. Bill. He worked as an investigative reporter for several newspapers, including the Los Angeles Herald-Examiner, and as an associate editor at New West and California. His writing has appeared in many other periodicals, such as Smithsonian Magazine ("Cook vs. Peary", April 2009), Esquire, and Playboy.

Notable books
Henderson's most recent book, New York Times bestseller Sons and Soldiers: The Untold Story of the Jews Who Escaped the Nazis and Returned with the U.S. Army to Fight Hitler, is the true story of the German-born Jews, dubbed the Ritchie Boys, who fled Nazi Germany in the 1930s, came of age in America, and returned to Europe at enormous personal risk as members of the U.S. Army's Military Intelligence Service to play a key role in the Allied victory. Sons and Soldiers has been published in twelve foreign countries. USA Today called it "thrilling...a spellbinding account of extraordinary men at war"  and The New York Post hailed it as "the last great unknown tale of World War II".

Henderson also wrote Rescue at Los Baños: The Most Daring Prison Camp Raid of World War II, a narrative nonfiction account of the February 23, 1945, Raid at Los Baños that freed more than 2,000 civilian prisoners of war – most of them American men, women and children, as well as other Allied nationalities – from an Imperial Japanese Army internment camp located 40 miles south of Manila. Rescue at Los Baños has received positive reviews from the trade and the media. Kirkus Reviews called it "riveting"  and The Costco Connection called the book "history as exciting as any work of fiction."

Henderson's national bestseller Hero Found: The Greatest POW Escape of the Vietnam War is the story of U.S. Navy pilot Dieter Dengler, who was shot down over Laos in January 1966 and escaped from a Pathet Lao POW camp six months later. Henderson and Dengler served together on the aircraft carrier USS Ranger (CVA-61) in 1965–66.

His true crime book And the Sea Will Tell, written with Charles Manson prosecutor Vincent Bugliosi, was a #1 New York Times hardcover bestseller and highly rated CBS miniseries. "The book succeeds on all counts", reported the Los Angeles Times. "The final pages are some of the most suspenseful in trial literature." Henderson followed with another true crime title, Trace Evidence: The Hunt for the I-5 Serial Killer.

Henderson's book True North: Peary, Cook, and The Race to the Pole examined the ongoing controversy as to which explorer reached the North Pole first: Robert Peary in 1909 or Frederick Cook in 1908. Publishers Weekly commented: "This adventure yarn delivers as both a cautionary tale and a fitting memorial to polar exploration." Henderson's other Arctic title, Fatal North: Murder and Survival on the First North Pole Expedition, tells the story of the ill-fated Charles Francis Hall expedition to the North Pole.

An experienced collaborative writer, Henderson co-authored Time Traveler: A Scientist's Personal Mission to Make Time Travel a Reality, the autobiography of African-American theoretical physicist Ronald Mallett, as well as Ring of Deceit: Inside the Biggest Sports and Bank Scandal in History, which chronicles the meteoric rise and fall of boxing promoter and convicted swindler Harold Smith.

Partial bibliography
Sons and Soldiers: The Untold Story of the Jews Who Escaped the Nazis and Returned with the U.S. Army to Fight Hitler  Rescue at Los Baños: The Most Daring Prison Camp Raid of World War IIHero Found: The Greatest POW Escape of the Vietnam WarDown to the Sea: An Epic Story of Naval Disaster and Heroism in World War IIAnd the Sea Will TellTrace Evidence: The Hunt for an Elusive Serial KillerFatal North: Murder and Survival on the First North Pole ExpeditionTrue North: Peary, Cook, and The Race to the PoleGhetto Cops: On the Streets of the Most Dangerous City in AmericaRing of Deceit: Inside the Biggest Sports and Bank Scandal in HistoryTime Traveler: A Scientist's Personal Mission to Make Time Travel a RealitySpy Dust: Two Masters of Disguise Reveal the Tools and Operations That Helped Win the Cold WarLeap of Faith: An Astronaut's Journey into the UnknownTaking Back Our Streets: Fighting Crime in AmericaErnest & Julio: Our Story

Film adaptations
A four-hour television miniseries adaptation of And the Sea Will Tell aired on CBS in 1991. Filmed in Vancouver, B.C. and Tahiti, it starred Rachel Ward, Richard Crenna, and James Brolin. Ring of Deceit: Inside the Biggest Sports and Bank Scandal in History,'' has been optioned for film by two-time Academy Award-winning director Rob Minkoff.

References

External links 
 Official Website and Blog
 Author's Facebook Page

Living people
American non-fiction writers
Writers from Oakland, California
Year of birth missing (living people)